The Peterborough Liberal Jewish Community is a Jewish community based in Peterborough, Cambridgeshire, England. It was founded in 1991 and is a constituent member of Liberal Judaism. It holds services on the first Saturday of the month and also on High Holy Days. Its rabbi is Dr Tali Artman Partock.

See also
 List of Jewish communities in the United Kingdom

References

External links 
 Official website
 Jewish Small Communities Network: Peterborough Liberal Jewish Community
 Peterborough Liberal Jewish Community on Jewish Communities and Records – UK (hosted by JewishGen)

1991 establishments in England
Liberal synagogues in the United Kingdom
Organisations based in Peterborough
Religion in Cambridgeshire
Jewish organizations established in 1991